Burshill is a hamlet in the East Riding of Yorkshire, England.

It forms part of the civil parish of Brandesburton.

Governance
The civil parish was in the Beverley and Holderness parliamentary constituency until the 2010 general election when it was transferred to the constituency of East Yorkshire.

References

Villages in the East Riding of Yorkshire